Arytenoid can refer to:

 Arytenoid cartilage, part of the larynx
 Arytenoid muscle, part of the larynx